Arthur Gooch  may refer to:
 Arthur Gooch (footballer) (born 1931), former Australian rules footballer
 Sir Arthur Gooch, 14th Baronet (born 1937), English baronet and retired British Army officer
 Arthur Gooch (criminal) (died 1936), American criminal and the only person ever executed under the Lindbergh kidnapping law